Tanaka is a Japanese restaurant in Portland, Oregon.

Description 

Tanaka is a Japanese bakery and katsu sandwich shop on Morrison Street in downtown Portland's West End. Brooke Jackson-Glidden of Eater Portland has described the business as "part Japanese patisserie, part katsu sandwich shop, [and] part brunch cafe". Andi Prewitt of Willamette Week called Tanaka a "spinoff of Japanese-based chain Kushikatsu Tanaka, which specializes in skewers (kushi) of bite-sized, breaded cutlets (katsu) served with a dipping sauce whose recipe has remained a well-guarded family secret for 70 years." The restaurant has indoor and outdoor seating, and the interior features a wall decoration with the text, "Of everything in the world, who knew bread would bring all these beautiful people together?"

Sandwich options have included chicken, pork, chicken, Oregon rockfish, and wagyu beef, all with shokupan (Japanese milk bread). The restaurant has also served a vegan option with oat milk, which Jackson-Glidden said in 2022 was the city's only dairy-free milk bread option. The menu has also included Japanese fruit sandwiches with milk bread and whipped cream, dorayaki, macarons (such as pistachio and ume varieties), matcha and miso croissants, mochi doughnuts, and coffee. Other pastries have included "black-sesame-raspberry Paris Brest, yuzu meringue tart with shiso and blackberries, a pyramid of pistachio sponge with raspberry compote and dark chocolate mousse."

History 
The team behind Afuri opened Tanaka on June 25, 2022, in a 5,500-square-foot space which previously housed a Blue Star Donuts shop.

Reception 
Katherine Chew Hamilton of Portland Monthly recommended the chicken katsu, eggplant, and pork katsu sandos, as well as the matcha opera cake and the miso chocolate chip cookie. She described the restaurant as "welcoming and expansive" and wrote, "Our take, overall, is that you can find better baked goods at Oyatsupan, and better sandos at Tokyo Sando. But on days that call for a sit-down lunch downtown, perhaps as an escape from the office or between museum-going, Tanaka is a good bet." Eater Portland's Brooke Jackson-Glidden included the business in a 2022 list of "The Hottest New Restaurants and Food Carts in Portland". The website's Michelle Lopez also included Tanaka in a 2022 overview of "Outstanding Bakeries in Portland and Beyond".

See also 

 List of bakeries
 List of Japanese restaurants

References

External links 

 

2022 establishments in Oregon
Bakeries of Oregon
Japanese restaurants in Portland, Oregon
Restaurants established in 2022
Sandwich restaurants
Southwest Portland, Oregon